The SS Snefjeld was a steam merchant ship that saw service through two world wars, at first under the Dutch flag, followed by the Norwegian.

Construction and early years
Snefjeld was completed in May 1901 at the yards of NV Scheepswerf Voorheen Jan Smit Czn, Alblasserdam. She initially entered service with NV Stoomvaart Mij Maasstad (Driebeek & Sons), Rotterdam in 1901 as the Maasstad. She served with them for eight years, being transferred to Stoomvaart Mij Nederlandsche Lloyd, Rotterdam in 1909, when she was renamed Ottoland. She was sold in 1915 to the Norwegian firm of Harald Grieg Martens, Bergen and was renamed Snefjeld.

Wartime career
She sailed in a number of allied convoys after the outbreak of the Second World War, her first being as part of the UK to Norway convoy ON 14 in February 1940. She returned in March with a cargo of pulp. She also made several transatlantic crossings, including with the Halifax to UK convoy HX 61, where she transported a cargo of pit props. She appears to have returned to North America in September with convoy OB 207.

Convoy SC 7
Snefjeld joined convoy SC 7 for the return voyage to the UK. She arrived at the convoy assembly point at Sydney, Nova Scotia from Caraquet, New Brunswick carrying a cargo of 719 standards of timber and bound for London. The convoy left Sydney on 5 October but later came under attack from a number of U-boats successfully utilising wolf pack tactics. One of the ships lost was the SS Thalia, a Greek merchant which was torpedoed and sunk on 19 October by Otto Kretschmer's . The Snefjeld stopped at 01:15 and lowered three boats to look for survivors from the Thalia. They located four and two boats returned to the Snefjeld and were prepared to be pulled back aboard. At 02:00 U-99 fired a torpedo at the stationary Snefjeld, hitting her on her starboard side near Hatch No. 2.

In the lifeboats
The second mate, the steward and the mess boy were injured in the explosion, whilst the first mate, who had been in one of the boats was blown into the water. He managed to reboard the Snefjeld but the ship was now ablaze. The Snefjeld listed to starboard sending the deck cargo on the foredeck overboard. The two lifeboats that had been lowered to search for the survivors were destroyed, but the motorboat which had also been launched was able to pick up several of the crew. The rest left the ship in a dinghy. The Snefjeld floated for another hour before breaking in two. She sank at about 08:00. There had been no casualties, and the survivors initially waited in the area in the hope of being spotted. When this did not happen they began to row towards land, but encountered heavy seas. The two boats were separated during the night, but were subsequently able to rejoin the next day. Later that day they came across one of the Thalia's empty lifeboats, and took on its supplies. They then spotted a man on some nearby wreckage. The boats eventually became separated however.

By now the motorboat had been leaking considerably and the men transferred into the lifeboat. The Clematis landed them at Methil on 26 October. The second mate, the steward and the messboy were subsequently hospitalised for a period of time.

References

External links
SS Snefjeld at Uboat.net
Accounts of Snefjeld
Snefjeld at the convoy database

Ships built in the Netherlands
Ships sunk by German submarines in World War II
Steamships of Norway
Ships of Nortraship
World War II shipwrecks in the Atlantic Ocean
1901 ships
Maritime incidents in October 1940